Caiçara Esporte Clube, commonly known as Caiçara, is a Brazilian football club based in Campo Maior, Piauí state. They competed once in the Copa do Brasil.

History
The club was founded on February 27, 1954 by employees of Casa Morais company and former supporters of another club of the city. Caiçara won the Campeonato Piauiense Second Level in 1963. The team finished as Campeonato Piauiense runners-up in 1963 and in 1990, and competed in the Copa do Brasil in 1991, when they were eliminated in the First Round by Atlético Mineiro. It became the first club from Piauí state to compete in a Brazilian national tournament.

Achievements
 Campeonato Piauiense Second Level:
 Winners (1): 1963

Stadium
Caiçara Esporte Clube play their home games at Estádio Deusdeth de Melo. The stadium has a maximum capacity of 4,000 people.

References

Football clubs in Piauí
Association football clubs established in 1954
1954 establishments in Brazil